Mabu may refer to:

 Horse stance
 Mabu, Nepal, village in Ilam District, Mechi Zone
 Mount Mabu, Mozambique
 Atheris mabuensis, the Mount Mabu forest viper
 The Coachman (Mabu), a 1961 South Korean film
 A nickname for people named Mabel
 Mabu, a cultivar of Karuka

Puerto Rico
 Mabú, a barrio of Humacao

China
Mabu, Anhui (麻埠镇), town in Jinzhai County
Mabu, Jiangxi (马埠镇), town in Xiajiang County
Mabu, Zhejiang (麻步镇), town in Pingyang County